SAS Manthatisi (S101) is a  currently in service with the South African Navy. SAS Manthatisi is named after the female warrior chief of the Batlokwa tribe. The Executive Mayor of Naledi Local Municipality and the godmother of the S101, Dr. Ruth Segomotso Mompati, announced the name of the submarine in 2006 at a ceremony in Simon's Town.

Background 
South Africa placed a contract for three Type 209/1400 submarines in July 2000 on Howaldtswerke-Deutsche Werft (HDW) and Thyssen Nordseewerke. The Heroine class are sometimes considered to be South Africa's first "true" submarines, as they were more suited to being underwater than the Daphné models.

Manthatisi arrived in Simon's Town on 8 April 2006, accompanied by the Valour-class frigate .

Operational history 

Exercise Amazolo, the first multi-navy exercise to involve ships of the North Atlantic Treaty Organisation (NATO) and the South African Navy took place in September 2007. After having ‘sunk’ the target being protected by the surface screen, the submarine turned on the surface warships and ‘sank’ each of them as well.

Manthatisi was withdrawn from service in 2007 and placed in reserve as part of the SAN's plan to maintain only two out of its three submarines in service. She began a refit in 2010, and re-entered service in October 2014.

References

External links 
 Global Security

Heroine-class submarines
Attack submarines
Submarines of South Africa
2004 ships
Military units and formations in Cape Town